Filipe Catto Alves (born Lajeado, 26 September 1987) is a Brazilian singer, instrumentalist, composer, illustrator and designer. He has worked with genres such as MPB, samba, tango, jazz, rock and bolero.

He has shared the stage with artists such as Maria Bethânia, Ney Matogrosso, Chico Buarque, Gilberto Gil, Beth Carvalho, Odair José, Marcelo Jeneci, Vanessa da Matta, Toquinho, Daniela Mercury, Zélia Duncan, Maria Gadú, Ana Carolina, Arnaldo Antunes, Nando Reis and Dzi Croquettes.

He frequently sings songs composed by other people, but has also authored songs of his own, both alone and in partnerships with artists such as Zélia Duncan, Tiê, Paulinho Moska and Pedro Luís.

Early life and first works 
Born in Lajeado and raised in the state capital Porto Alegre, Catto would sing in parties with his father. As a teenager, he sang in some rock bands. In 2006, he began a solo career performing at bars and released some works on the internet. In 2008, he and director João Pedro Madureira started the show "Ouro e Pétala", involving vocals, acoustic guitar and claps. In 2009, Catto released the Saga EP for free download.

Career

2011-2017: Fôlego and Tomada 
In 2011, the track "Saga" was featured on the soundtrack for the Cordel Encantado telenovela. Catto signed with Universal Music and recorded his first album: Fôlego. In November 2011 he started the Fôlego Tour at Theatro São Pedro (Porto Alegre).

Catto wrote a Portuguese version of "No Me Compares" ("Não Me Compares"), originally written in Spanish by Alejandro Sanz. Catto's version was recorded by Sanz himself featuring Ivete Sangalo as part of the Salve Jorge telenovela's soundtrack.

In 2013, he released his first live album and DVD, Entre Cabelos, Olhos e Furacões. The release shows took place at the Teatro Sesc Vila Mariana, in São Paulo, on 3 August 2013.

On 8 September 2015, he released his sophomore album Tomada via Agência de Música and Radar Records. The album release show happened on 14 November 2015, at the Auditório Ibirapuera, in São Paulo. Dois dias antes do lançamento deste álbum, Catto se apresentou com a Orquestra Sinfônica e o Coro Lírico de Minas Gerais no Palácio das Artes em Belo Horizonte, onde foram executadas suas próprias músicas com arranjos compostos especialmente para essa apresentação.

Still in 2015, he guest performed on "Trono de Estudar", a song written by Dani Black in support of secondary students who opposed the São Paulo state government's plan to re-structure the state schools. The track featured 17 other artists: Chico Buarque, Arnaldo Antunes (ex-Titãs), Tiê, Dado Villa-Lobos (Legião Urbana), Paulo Miklos (Titãs), Tiago Iorc, Lucas Silveira (Fresno), Zélia Duncan, Pedro Luís (Pedro Luís & A Parede), Fernando Anitelli (O Teatro Mágico), André Whoong, Lucas Santtana, Miranda Kassin, Tetê Espíndola, Helio Flanders (Vanguart), Felipe Roseno and Xuxa Levy.

In 2016, he was featured at the second episode of Versões, a Canal Bis program, in which he sang hits by Cássia Eller, such as “Gatas Extraordinárias”, "Malandragem”, “Relicário”, "O Segundo Sol", among others. The show became a tour that took him to several cities  including São Paulo, where he performed at the 2017 Virada Cultural, in which he called for direct elections following the impeachment of Dilma Rousseff.

Also in 2017, he toured with Simone Mazzer for the Prêmio da Música Brasileira, with Gonzaguinha tribute shows.

In 2017, he began the "Over" tour, having only acoustic guitarists Pedro Sá and Luís Felipe de Lima as supporting musicians. Catto performed songs from his previous albums and also songs by Portishead, Marília Mendonça and Vinicius de Moraes.

Still in 2017, he performed in a series of shows with artists such as Maria Bethânia, Vanessa da Matta, Johnny Hooker, Xênia França and Mestrinho. He paid a tribute to Vinicius de Moraes at Espaço das Américas besides Toquinho and Daniela Mercury, and to Dalva de Oliveira's centennial at Teatro J Safra in São Paulo, besides singers such as Angela Maria, Alaíde Costa, As Bahia e a Cozinha Mineira, Ayrton Montarroyos, Célia, Cida Moreira, Claudette Soares, Edy Star, Fafá de Belém, Marina de La Riva, Maria Alcina, Márcio Gomes, Tetê Espíndola, Veronica Ferriani and Virgínia Rosa. He also performed a solo tribute to Cauby Peixoto at Bar Brahma; Peixoto once cited Catto as one of his favorite new singers.

2017-present: CATTO and other projects 
On 24 November 2017, he released his third studio album CATTO.

Critic Hagamenon Brito, from Correio da Bahia, said CATTO is Catto's best album and that he is the best singer of his generation. "It was the discovery of my silence, of what was essential following the end of a seven-year marriage, of moving out, of my arrival to the 30's. Professionally, I didn't need a new album but everything flowed cinematographically to this", he said in an interview to the critic.

His "O Nascimento de Vênus Tour" was premiered in Portugal and at Sesc Vila Mariana in São Paulo in early 2018.

In March, he took the tour to the United States, with three shows at SxSW festivalin Austin, Texas. The festival's website described Catto as "one of the great Brazilian voices from the 21st century, like a diva and something between Freddie Mercury and Maria Bethânia, between bolero and modern glam rock”.

On 28 May, the video for "Manifestação" was released, featuring 30 artists celebrating the 70th anniversary of the Universal Declaration of Human Rights.

On 27 July, he took the "O Nascimento de Vênus Tour" to the Garanhuns Winter Festival (FIG 2018), performing at the main stage alongside Gaby Amarantos and Johnny Hooker. On the following day, he performed at the Lula Livre Festival, at the Arcos da Lapa in Rio de Janeiro, besides artists such as Chico Buarque, Gilberto Gil, Beth Carvalho, Odair José, Marcelo Jeneci, Aíla, Gang 90 and other who believed former president Lula da Silva should be released from prison following corruption accusations.

Since the beginning of the COVID-19 pandemic, he presents the karaoke program Love Catto Live.

Personal Life 
Filipe is non-binary.

Discography 
 2009 - Saga (EP)
 2011 - Fôlego
 2013 - Entre Cabelos, Olhos e Furacões (live)
 2015 - Tomada
 2017 - CATTO

Singles 
 "Adoração" (2011)
 "Flor da Idade" (2013)
 "Eu Te Amo (And I Love Her)" (2013)
 "Dias e Noites" (2015)
 "Paloma Negra" (2016)
 "Eu Não Quero Mais" (2017)
 "Canção de Engate" (2017)

Soundtrack appearances 
 "Saga" in Cordel Encantado (2011)
 "Quem É Você" Sangue Bom (2013)
 "Adoração" Saramandaia (2013)
 "Flor da Idade" Joia Rara (2013)
 "Redoma" in the film Linda, uma História Horrível (2014)
 "Teu Quarto" in the webseries Rosa (2018)

Videography

Videos 
 "Dias e Noites" - dir. Fernanda Rotta e Rodrigo Pesavento (2015) 
 "Do Fundo do Coração" - feat. Dzi Croquettes - dir. Marcos Mello Cavallaria e Ciro Barcellos (2017) 
 "Lua Deserta" - dir. Marcos Mello Cavallaria (2017)
 "Canção de Engate" - dir. Joana Linda (2018)
 "É Sempre o Mesmo Lugar" - dir. Daguito Rodrigues (2019)
 "Eu Não Quero Mais" - dir. Ismael Caneppele (2019)
 "Um Nota Um" - dir. Couple of Things (2019)
 "Faz Parar" - dir. Romy Pocztaruk e Livia Pasqual (2019)

DVDs 
 "Entre Cabelos, Olhos e Furacões (live)" - dir. Willand Pinsdorf (2013)

Video-album 
 CATTO + MÉLIÈS - dir. Daguito Rodrigues e Filipe Catto (2018)

Tours 
 "Saga" (2009-2011)
 "Fôlego" (2011-2013)
 "Entre Cabelos, Olhos e Furacões" (2013-2015)
 "Coração Intransitivo", with Célia and Márcia Castro (2015)
 "Tomada" (2015-2017)
 "Catto Canta Cássia" (2015-2017)
 "Filipe Catto & Simone Mazzer" (2016)
 "Over" (2017)
 "O Nascimento de Vênus Tour" (2018-2020)
 ”Vênus Unplugged - Voz&Violão” (2019-2020)
 "Persona: Filipe Catto & Johnny Hooker" (2019-2020)

Awards and nominations

Prêmio da Música Brasileira

Prêmio Contigo! MPB FM

Troféu APCA

Prêmio Açorianos

Festival Internacional de Cinema de Gramado

Others 
 2011 - Best Song ("Adoração") - 10th place - Best 2011 songs - Rolling Stone Brasil
 2011 - Best of the Year- UOL Música
 2012 - Best Brazilian Singers of the Past 10 Years  – Blog Mais Cultura Brasileira
 2014 - Best Song ("Redoma") - Mostra Gaúcha of the 42º Festival de Cinema de Gramado, for the film Linda, uma História Horrível
 2015 - Best Singer - Revista Quem
 2015 - Best Albums of 2015 (Tomada) - Música Inspira
 2015 - Best Albums of 2015 (Tomada) - Move That Jukebox
 2016 - Best Singer - Revista Feminino e Além
 2016 - Best Show (Turnê "Tomada") - 2nd place - Festival Vento
 2017 - Top5 Virals in Brazil from Spotify (Single "Eu Não Quero Mais")
 2017 - Best Alternative Singer - Prêmio Radiola 2017
 2017 - Melhor Disco do Ano (CATTO) - Popland/Correio da Bahia
 2017 - Melhor Disco do Ano (CATTO) - Central da MPB
 2017 - Best Albums of the Year (CATTO) - Napster
 2017 - Best Albums of the Year (CATTO) - Capuccino Pop
 2017 - Best Albums of the Year  (CATTO) - 505 Indie
 2017 - Best Albums of the Year (CATTO) - Embrulhador
 2017 - Best Albums of the Year (CATTO) - Página Dois
 2017 - Best Albums of the Year (CATTO) - Audiograma
 2017 - Best Albums of the Year (CATTO) - Scream&Yell
 2017 - Best Videos of the Year  ("Lua Deserta")
 2017 - Best Covers Arts of the Year (CATTO)
 2017 - Best Singles of the Year ("Eu Não Quero Mais")
 2017 - Best Songs of the Year ("Faz Parar")
 2017 - 20 Best Singles of the Year ("Lua Deserta" and "Do Fundo do Coração")
 2017 - 50 Best Songs of the Year ("Eu Não Quero Mais")
 2017 - 100 Best Songs of the Year ("Torrente") - Timbre
 2017 - 100 Best Songs of the Year ("Canção de Engate") - Embrulhador
 2018 - Best Videos of the Year ("Canção de Engate") - Pipoca Moderna
 2018 - 50 Best Videos of the Year ("Canção de Engate") - MultimodoBR
 Best Videos of 2019 ("Eu Não Quero Mais") - Hits Perdidos

References 

1987 births
Living people
People from Lajeado
Música Popular Brasileira singers
Samba musicians
Música Popular Brasileira guitarists
Musicians from Rio Grande do Sul
Countertenors